Mara Davis (MER-ah; IPA [ˈmɛra])  (born July 28, 1969, in New York City) is an American radio personality.

Biography
Davis was born to a Jewish family in New York City. She began her career in 1987 at WMLN-FM, Curry College radio. Upon graduation Davis worked in promotions at WZOU-FM Boston. She was fired, due to budget cuts, in 1992. She moved to Rochester, New York, where she landed a late-night job at WRQI-FM. Davis soon found herself in the same slot in Atlanta at WZGC FM, Z-93. In 1996, she was moved to mid-days where she created the Out to Lunch hour. In 2003, Davis launched the Mara Davis and Dunham Morning Show on Z-93 with co-host Jeff Dunham.

Until recently, Davis was the award-winning mid-day DJ at WZGC 92.9 "dave fm" in Atlanta. Davis hosted a show called Radio Free Lunch where she came up with a daily topic and listeners called and requested songs relating to the theme. The show was a mix of rock n’ roll, talk and interviews. In October 2012 the radio station WZGC 92.9 retired "dave fm" and turned to a 24-hour sports-talk format. Davis was also featured briefly in a season 4 episode of Bravo's Tabatha Takes Over.

Awards and honors 
Davis was voted Creative Loafing’s “Best Radio DJ” in 2000, 2001, 2007,2008 and 2009. She also was honored as “Woman of the Month” by Atlanta Woman magazine in 2004.

Personal life 
Davis lives in the Virginia-Highland neighborhood of Atlanta, with her husband Mike Kane and son. Her husband is Catholic.

References

External links

Sources
 Access Atlanta Article
 Creative Loafing Article
 American Jewish Life Magazine Article
 Mindspring Article
 The Biscuit Blog Interview
 Atlanta Magazine
 The Atlanta Jewish Times Online
Sunday Paper Article
 Atlanta Magazine

1969 births
Living people
20th-century American Jews
Radio personalities from Atlanta
Curry College alumni
21st-century American Jews